

Portugal's busiest airports by passenger traffic

In graph

2017

2016

2015

2014

2013

References

Portugal
Busy
Airports, busiest
Portugal
Airports, busiest

it:Aeroporti più trafficati in Europa